Ciaran Patrick O'Brien (born November 17, 1987) is an American soccer coach and former player.

Early life and education 
O'Brien played center midfield for four years at Decatur High School in Federal Way, Washington, where he earned NSCAA All-American honors, was a First Team All-South Puget Sound League selection for four straight years, and was selected as the Washington State Gatorade Player of the Year after his senior season.

O'Brien initially played college soccer for the University of San Diego, where he was a NSCAA Freshman All-American and was named to the All-WCC Second Team, before transferring to UC Santa Barbara in his sophomore year.  With the UCSB Gauchos, he made the 2007 NCAA Tournament, losing out to national finalists Ohio State.  He was named the 2007 Big West Midfielder of the Year with UCSB, as well as the highest scoring player in the Big West with 25 points on seven goals and 11 assists.  During his college years O'Brien also played for Tacoma Tide of the USL Premier Development League, where his father was head coach.

Playing career 
O'Brien left UCSB early without graduating, signing a Generation Adidas contract in the process.  He was the 5th overall pick in the 2008 MLS SuperDraft, selected by the Colorado Rapids.  He made his MLS debut as a substitute in the 71st minute in Colorado's first match of the 2008 season against Los Angeles Galaxy on March 29, 2008, but was sent off in the 90th minute for a tackle on Carlos Ruiz.  The tackle tore meniscus in Ruiz right knee leaving him out for an extended period.  It was O'Brien's only MLS game of his career so far.

O'Brien was sent on loan to USL First Division side, Seattle Sounders, in August 2008 to gain first team experience.  With the Sounders, O'Brien appeared in 5 league games (309 minutes total) tallying 2 assists.  He also appeared in a Lamar Hunt U.S. Open Cup game.  However, O'Brien was soon recalled and was back with Colorado at the end of August.

In June 2009, O'Brien made a season long loan to USL-1 side Austin Aztex. In July 2009, he was signed on a loan from Colorado Rapids by Impact de Montréal until the end if the 2009 USL season.

During summer 2010, O'Brien trialed with League of Ireland Premier Division side Sporting Fingal but a loan deal with Colorado could not be agreed.

O'Brien graduated from the MLS Generation Adidas program on November 18, 2010. O'Brien became a MLS free agent when Colorado declined his 2011 contract option and he was not selected in the 2010 MLS Re-Entry Draft.

 O'Brien signed with North American Soccer League club Atlanta Silverbacks on March 21, 2011. O'Brien won his first league honors on July 11, 2011, winning the NASL Offensive Player of the Week. Atlanta announced on November 8, 2011 that O'Brien would return for the 2012 season.

On February 21, 2013, it was announced that O'Brien had signed with Carolina RailHawks for the 2013 season.

Coaching career 
O'Brien was named as an assistant coach of the UC Santa Barbara Gauchos men's soccer team in August 2015.

Personal life 
O'Brien is the son of former Republic of Ireland international player Fran O'Brien, and the brother of fellow professional soccer player Leighton O'Brien.

References

External links 
 
 
 
 
 UC Santa Barbara player profile
 San Diego player profile

1987 births
Living people
American soccer players
Atlanta Silverbacks players
Austin Aztex FC players
North Carolina FC players
Colorado Rapids players
Colorado Rapids draft picks
Association football midfielders
Major League Soccer players
Montreal Impact (1992–2011) players
North American Soccer League players
San Antonio Scorpions players
San Diego Toreros men's soccer players
Seattle Sounders (1994–2008) players
Soccer players from Tacoma, Washington
Seattle Sounders FC U-23 players
UC Santa Barbara Gauchos men's soccer players
USL First Division players
USL League Two players
People from Federal Way, Washington
UC Santa Barbara Gauchos men's soccer coaches